Javier del Amor (born 6 August 1976) is a Spanish motorcycle racer. He rides a BMW S1000RR in the RFME Superstock 1000 Championship. Del Amor made his only appearance in MotoGP as a replacement rider the 2013 Catalan Grand Prix when FTR competitor Hiroshi Aoyama required microsurgery to a broken finger he sustained in practice.

Career statistics

Superbike World Championship

Races by year
(key) (Races in bold indicate pole position) (Races in italics indicate fastest lap)

By season

Races by year
(key) (Races in bold indicate pole position) (Races in italics indicate fastest lap)

References

External links
  

Living people
Spanish motorcycle racers
Motorcycle racers from Catalonia
1976 births
Avintia Racing MotoGP riders
MotoGP World Championship riders